Alma is a city in and the county seat of Buffalo County, Wisconsin, United States. The population was 716 at the 2020 census.

The motto for the city of Alma is: "Step into Living History."

History
Alma was named in commemoration of the Battle of Alma, in the Crimean War.

Geography

Demographics

2020 census
As of the census of 2020, the population was 716. The racial makeup of the city was 94.7% White, 1.5% Native American, 0.6% Black or African American, 0.3% Pacific Islander, 0.1% Asian, 1.0% from other races, and 1.8% from two or more races. Ethnically, the population was 2.9% Hispanic or Latino of any race.

2010 census
As of the census of 2010, there were 781 people, 386 households, and 202 families living in the city. The racial makeup of the city was 98.5% White, 0.1% African American, 0.4% Native American, 0.1% Asian, and 0.9% from two or more races. Hispanic or Latino of any race were 0.6% of the population.

There were 386 households, of which 17.1% had children under the age of 18 living with them, 41.7% were married couples living together, 7.3% had a female householder with no husband present, 3.4% had a male householder with no wife present, and 47.7% were non-families. 41.2% of all households were made up of individuals, and 21% had someone living alone who was 65 years of age or older. The average household size was 1.95 and the average family size was 2.62.

The median age in the city was 50.3 years. 15.4% of residents were under the age of 18; 5.8% were between the ages of 18 and 24; 21.3% were from 25 to 44; 30% were from 45 to 64; and 27.5% were 65 years of age or older. The gender makeup of the city was 51.0% male and 49.0% female.

2000 census
As of the census of 2000, there were 942 people, 421 households, and 261 families living in the city. The population density was 160.8 people per square mile (62.1/km2). There were 495 housing units at an average density of 84.5 per square mile (32.6/km2). The racial makeup of the city was 97.03% White, 0.21% Black or African American, 0.85% Native American, 0.32% Asian, 0.11% Pacific Islander, and 1.49% from two or more races. 0.85% of the population were Hispanic or Latino of any race.

There were 421 households, out of which 23.0% had children under the age of 18 living with them, 52.5% were married couples living together, 6.4% had a female householder with no husband present, and 37.8% were non-families. 31.4% of all households were made up of individuals, and 14.5% had someone living alone who was 65 years of age or older. The average household size was 2.20 and the average family size was 2.74.

In the city, the population was spread out, with 19.7% under the age of 18, 7.6% from 18 to 24, 25.5% from 25 to 44, 23.1% from 45 to 64, and 24.0% who were 65 years of age or older. The median age was 43 years. For every 100 females, there were 98.3 males. For every 100 females age 18 and over, there were 97.9 males.

The median income for a household in the city was $34,250, and the median income for a family was $45,625. Males had a median income of $31,806 versus $21,250 for females. The per capita income for the city was $21,885. About 5.6% of families and 8.9% of the population were below the poverty line, including 5.8% of those under age 18 and 14.5% of those age 65 or over.

Economy

The Great Alma Fishing Float has been an attraction to tourists, and is particularly popular during the annual walleye run. It is located next to Lock & Dam Number 4 on the Mississippi River. Mississippi River Lock and Dam No. 4, is a major nesting ground for the bald eagles that can be observed with great frequency from Alma's riverbank. Also located in Alma is Castlerock Museum, a collection of arms and armor from the times of the Romans to the Middle Ages.

Power stations
 Alma Generating Station
 John P. Madgett Generating Station

Notable people

 Carol Bartz, CEO of Yahoo!, former chairman of the board, president, and CEO of Autodesk, Inc.
 John W. DeGroff, Member of the Wisconsin Senate from the 24th district
 Arnold Gesell, psychologist
 Edmund Hitt, Wisconsin state legislator
 Guy LeRoy Hunner, Physician, Johns Hopkins University School of Medicine, Baltimore, Maryland.
 John Hunner, Wisconsin State Treasurer
 Doug Kane, Illinois legislator
 Robert Lees, Wisconsin state legislator
 James Arthur Mathieu, Canadian lumber king
 Conrad Moser, Jr., Wisconsin state legislator
 Peter Polin, Wisconsin politician and businessman
 Frank Schaettle, Wisconsin state legislator
 John Tester, businessman and Wisconsin state legislator
 Kathleen Vinehout, Member of the Wisconsin Senate from the 31st district

See also
 List of cities in Wisconsin

References

External links

 Alma Wisconsin Tourism Commission 
 City of Alma
 Alma Chamber of Commerce website
 Sanborn fire insurance maps: 1889 1894 1900 1910

Cities in Wisconsin
Cities in Buffalo County, Wisconsin
County seats in Wisconsin
Wisconsin populated places on the Mississippi River